Melanolophia centralis is a species of geometrid moth in the family Geometridae. It is found in North America.

The MONA or Hodges number for Melanolophia centralis is 6619.

References

Further reading

 

Melanolophiini
Articles created by Qbugbot
Moths described in 1920